Kibbie may refer to:

Food 
Kibbeh, a dish of meat mixed with bulgur and spices, popular in the Middle East

People 
Hod Kibbie (1903–1975), American baseballer
Jack Kibbie (born 1929), Iowa State Senator
James Kibbie (born 1949), American concert organist, recording artist, and pedagogue

Places 
Kibbie Dome, a multi-purpose indoor athletic stadium
Kibbie Lake, a lake which lies in the Yosemite National Park in the USA
 Kibbie, Illinois
 Kibbie, Michigan

See also
Kibbee, a list of people with the surname
 Kibby (disambiguation)
 Kibbe (surname)